Venezuela at the Pan American Games.

Medal count

External links
- Comité Olímpico Venezolano Official site.

References